The Ghana Police College was established in 1959 in Tesano, Accra to policemen and women in Ghana. Before its establishment all Senior Police Officers were trained in the United Kingdom.

References

1959 establishments in Ghana
Education in Accra
Educational institutions established in 1959
Police academies